I Live Alone may refer to:

 I Live Alone (TV series), a South Korean TV series
 I Live Alone (album), a 1997 album